iX is a German monthly computer magazine, published by the Heise Verlag publishing house since 1988. The magazine focuses primarily on professional IT. Within this area it deals with a broad range of issues, ranging from various programming topics, server hardware reviews and virtualization, computer security to articles about emerging technologies and current IT related legal or political issues. The magazine is headquartered in Hannover.

It has an older sister magazine, c't, which covers general computer technology.

The magazine had a sold circulation of about 51,000 (Q3/2008; printed circulation: 72,000)..

External links 
 Homepage
 Heise Verlag homepage and news site
 Mediadata iX

1988 establishments in West Germany
Computer magazines published in Germany
German-language magazines
Magazines established in 1988
Mass media in Hanover
Monthly magazines published in Germany